No, No, No may refer to:

Music
 NoNoNo (band), a Swedish dance-pop trio

Albums
No No No (Beirut album), 2015
No, No, No (Dawn Penn album), 1994
No No No (compilation), a garage rock compilation album released in 1998

Songs
"No No No" (Apink song), 2013
"No, No, No" (Destiny's Child song), 1997
"No, No, No" (Ted Nugent song), 1982
"No, no, no" (Thalía song), 2006
"No, No, No" (Yoko Ono song), 1981
"Can Anyone Explain? (No! No! No!)", a 1950 song by Bennie Benjamin and George David Weiss
"No, No, No", a 1956 song by James Brown
"No, No, No", a 1965 song by Crispian St. Peters
"No, No, No", a song by Eve from her 2001 album Scorpion
"No, No, No", a song by Kiss from their 1987 album Crazy Nights
"No No No", a song by Deep Purple from their 1971 album Fireball
"No No No", a song by Def Leppard from their 1981 album High 'n' Dry
"No No No", a song by Yeah Yeah Yeahs from their 2003 album Fever to Tell
"No No No", a 2016 song made by TheFatRat
"No No No", a 2020 song by Flipp Dinero featuring A Boogie Wit Da Hoodie

Video games
"No No No", also known as "N3", a large alliance of players in the video game Ark: Survival Evolved

Other uses
 "No. No. No." (Margaret Thatcher), quote by Margaret Thatcher

See also
No (disambiguation)
"Nobody but Me" (The Human Beinz song)